Duma is a Bantu language spoken in Gabon.

References

Nzebi languages
Languages of Gabon